Dr Rajashree Mallick is an Indian politician. She was elected to the Lok Sabha, lower house of the Parliament of India from Jagatsinghpur, Odisha in the 2019 Indian general election as a member of the Biju Janata Dal. She was earlier elected to the Legislative Assembly of Odisha from Tirtol in 2014.

References

External links
 Official biographical sketch in Parliament of India website

Living people
India MPs 2019–present
Lok Sabha members from Odisha
Biju Janata Dal politicians
Odisha MLAs 2014–2019
People from Jagatsinghpur district
1964 births